Private schools provide an alternative education option to families in Sri Lanka who are seeking a different approach to education than what is offered by public schools. These schools are typically funded through private means, such as tuition fees, donations, or endowments, and may offer a local or international curriculum. Private schools are often associated with higher academic standards, smaller class sizes, and better resources than government schools. However, they can also come with a higher cost, making them less accessible to families with lower incomes. In Sri Lanka, private schools with British or American influences in their curriculum are particularly popular.

Private schools in Sri Lanka have several formations including private schools with local or international curriculums, semi-govenment schools, government-aided schools, and government schools with autonomy. Private schools with local curriculum adhere to national education standards while private schools with international curriculum provide globally recognized qualifications. Government-aided schools receive financial assistance from the government, and government schools with autonomy have some degree of independence. Private schools are often associated with higher academic standards and better resources than government schools, but may have higher tuition fees. Some private schools in Sri Lanka have a British or American influence in their curriculum. Semi-government schools are also present in Sri Lanka, partially funded by the government and partially by private means.

Private Schools with Local Curriculum
In Sri Lanka, privately-run schools that follow the local curriculum are generally referred to as "private schools." These schools are particularly popular among parents who value education in the national languages of Sinhala, Tamil, and English. whereas some private schools with local curriculums may only offer English-medium education.

Well-known private schools in Sri Lanka that offer local curriculums include S. Thomas' College, St. Joseph's College, and Trinity College, Kandy. Schools for girls that focus on local syllabus include Musaeus College, Ladies' College, Colombo, Bishop's College, Colombo, and Hillwood College, Kandy. These schools prepare students for national examinations and emphasize cultural values and local traditions.

While local private schools do not offer international qualifications such as the International Baccalaureate (IB) or Cambridge International Examinations (CIE), they continue to be popular among parents who value traditional education. S. Thomas' College, for example, has a long and rich history in Sri Lanka and is widely recognized for its academic and sporting achievements. With its main campus located in Mount Lavinia and branches in Kollupitiya, Gurutalawa, Bandarawela, and Trinity College, Kandy, it remains one of the most prominent private schools on the island.

Private Schools with International Curriculum
Private schools with international curriculum in Sri Lanka are commonly identified as "international schools". Private schools in Sri Lanka that offer international curriculums provide students with the opportunity to receive a globally recognized education. These schools follow internationally recognized curriculums such as the International Baccalaureate (IB) or Cambridge International Examinations (CIE).

Some of the prominent private schools in Sri Lanka that offer international curriculums include Colombo International School, Gateway College, Elizabeth Moir School, and Lyceum International School. These schools focus on preparing students for international higher education and often have a diverse student body, with students from various nationalities.

The curriculums offered by these schools are usually more comprehensive and challenging than the local syllabus and include a broader range of subjects such as foreign languages, arts, and humanities. The teachers in these schools are often qualified to teach these international curriculums and are trained to provide students with a global perspective.

Private schools with international curriculums are often more expensive than local private schools, but they provide students with the opportunity to receive a world-class education and to compete on an international level.

Semi-government schools
Semi-government schools in Sri Lanka are partially funded by the government and partially by private means. These schools have a greater degree of autonomy than government schools, allowing them to make decisions and manage their affairs independently to some extent.

One example of a semi-government school in Sri Lanka is Mahinda College, Galle. Founded in 1892, it is one of the oldest educational institutions in the country and has a strong reputation for academic excellence and sports. The school receives financial assistance from the government but is also supported by a network of alumni and private donors.

Another example of a semi-government school in Sri Lanka is Dharmaraja College, Kandy. Established in 1887, it is one of the leading boys' schools in the country, known for its academic and sporting achievements. The school receives funding from the government, but also has a strong network of private supporters and alumni.

Semi-government schools in Sri Lanka are often seen as a middle ground between government schools and private schools, offering high-quality education while also being more affordable than fully private institutions. These schools often have a strong emphasis on cultural values and traditions, as well as academic excellence and extracurricular activities.

Government-Aided Schools
In Sri Lanka, schools that receive government funding and support but have some level of independence in decision-making and management are considered government-aided schools. This allows them to operate with greater flexibility while still being subject to government oversight.

One example of such schools is the Central Schools, locally known as Kendriya Vidyalaya, which are administered by the central government. Another example is the Navodaya Vidyalaya system of schools. These schools may not be completely privately run, but their standards and quality of education are generally high.

These government-aided schools play a crucial role in providing quality education to Sri Lankan students while also ensuring that cultural values and traditions are preserved.

Government schools with autonomy
Several public schools in Sri Lanka have been granted a degree of autonomy by the government, allowing them to make decisions and manage their affairs independently of direct government control. While the extent of this autonomy may vary, these schools are generally considered to be among the most prestigious and academically rigorous in the country.

Ananda College, Nalanda College, and Visakha Vidyalaya are just a few examples of public schools in Sri Lanka that have been granted some degree of autonomy. These schools often have a long and storied history, with a reputation for excellence in academics, sports, and extracurricular activities.

Royal College is another prominent public school in Sri Lanka that has been granted a high degree of autonomy. Founded in 1835, Royal College is widely regarded as one of the most prestigious and competitive schools in the country, with a strong emphasis on academic excellence and leadership development.

While autonomy grants these schools greater flexibility in decision-making and curriculum development, they are still ultimately subject to government oversight and control. Nevertheless, the autonomy granted to these institutions helps to maintain their status as some of the most respected and sought-after schools in Sri Lanka.

To learn more about Sri Lanka's education system, please see Education in Sri Lanka.

References